Night service, sometimes also known as owl service, is a mode of public transport service operated during the night hours. As an intermediate approach – between providing full service around the clock and stopping services altogether – it provides more limited service during times of lower passenger volume, saving resources and allowing for maintenance on primary transportation systems. They typically offer fewer routes and less frequent service. Night-based services may be differently branded compared to daytime services. Examples are London and Chicago, where overnight buses are prefixed with an "N" for "night". Another common way to distinguish night services from their daytime counterparts is dark-colored line numbers. Some cities apply a different fare structure for night services from their daytime services.

Characteristics

24-hour, continuous rapid transit operation is practiced in some cities, most notably the subway in New York City, which essentially renders night services unneeded. Many of New York City's buses also have 24-hour operation; and around the world, night services may be provided by virtue of 24-hour services on daytime routes, as does Berlin on its "Metrotram" routes.

Where it exists, night service is generally much more limited in geographic coverage than daytime services, with fewer lines and perhaps routes over different paths from daytime services; routes serving more stops than during the daytime; or the night terminus may be in a different place. Networks may run longer routes than daytime services, sometimes combining two or more daytime routes, which may use interchanges to reach the same outlying districts. Night services usually also run less frequently. For example, according to the New York City Transit Authority's Service Guidelines Manual, New York City buses are required to operate at least every 30 minutes all times except late nights. Local bus frequencies during late night times (defined as 1a.m. – 5a.m.) are required to operate at least every 60 minutes.

Because of much longer intervals between services than during the day, night routes often offer guaranteed transfers to other lines or transit modes (such as regional and intercity rail). To ease planning, many cities use a central hub where all lines converge at a specific time. This makes the line map of many night services look like a wheel with radial lines to the center and some additional lines connecting the outer ends (or running along a ring road outside of the city center). For example, many London night bus routes converge on Trafalgar Square.

Africa

Asia

China

Beijing: 1-38[d] Night. The prefix , meaning 'night', denotes buses serving the urban core and some of the larger suburbs that run from 23:20 to 4:50. Their number scheme is distinct from other buses, such that Bus 26 follows a different route from Beijing Bus 26. 10, 20, 30 are loop lines.
Hong Kong: Night buses (Chinese: , literally 'overnight bus') are often, but not always prefixed with the letter N and operated by all franchised bus companies (Kowloon Motor Bus, Long Win Bus, Citybus, New World First Bus and New Lantau Bus).
Macau: TCM (Transport Company Macau) operates night service public buses across Macau, Taipa, and Coloane in seven routes. Such totes have prefix 'N' (N1A, N1B, N2, N3, N4, N5 and N6).
Shanghai: Line numbers between 300 and 399 are night buses.

India
Kolkata: It is the first city on the Indian subcontinent to have night service buses and trams. It has night service buses and trams operated by WBTC mainly from major stations and airport to hospitals and various parts of the city. The vehicles are numbered "NS" indicating night service followed by route number. Currently 15 routes exist.
Pune: Pune Mahanagar Parivahan Mahamandal Limited operates night buses from Katraj, Shivajinagar, Pune Station and Hadapsar bus depots. Currently it operates such services on nine routes. The services are named ratrani, meaning 'night'.
Bengaluru: Bangalore Metropolitan Transport Corporation (BMTC) operates Vayu Vajra buses in route 'KIAS 9' from Kempegowda International Airport to Kempegowda Bus Station outside Bengaluru City Railway Station. It also operates night service buses on other routes from 11:00pm to 5:00am. Night Buses have one and half times more fare than normal buses.
New Delhi: Delhi Transport Corporation (DTC) operates whole night bus service 'Express 4' to and from Indira Gandhi International Airport terminal 2 to I.S.B.T Kashmere Gate. It also operates night service bus on 28 other routes. Buses have the prefix 'O'.
Vasai-Virar: Vasai-Virar Municipal Transport (VVMT) operates night service buses on four routes of day service buses (105, 202, 303, 305).
 Chennai: Metropolitan Transport Corporation operates night service buses on 34 routes all across the city.
Hyderabad: Telangana State Road Transport Corporation (TSRTC) operates buses on 35 routes post 9:00p.m. with 93 trips. Soon such services would be increased.
Mumbai: BEST operates buses on eight routes from 11:15p.m. to 6:00a.m. Apart from this the suburban railway operates all night barring a technical break between 2 and 4 am.

South Korea
Seoul: The Seoul Metropolitan Government has provided a Night Bus, also known as the "Owl Bus", since 2013. Route numbers include the N13, N15, N16, N26, N30, N37, N61, N62 and N65. In October 2016, the Seoul Metropolitan Government added route N65 and increased the number of buses serving the existing routes. The buses operate between the hours of 23:30 and 03:45 (approx.)

Europe

Belgium 
 Brussels: Since April 2007, the Brussels Intercommunal Transport Company (STIB/MIVB) has operated a night bus network called Noctis on Friday and Saturday nights from midnight until 3 a.m. The service consists of 11 routes (N04, N05, N06, N08, N09, N10, N11, N12, N13, N16 and N18). The fare on these night buses is the same as during the day. All the lines leave from the Place de la Bourse/Beursplein in the city centre at 30 minutes intervals and cover all the main streets in the capital, as they radiate outwards to the suburbs. Noctis services returned from 2 July 2021 after over a year of disruption due to the COVID-19 pandemic in Belgium.
 Leuven: The Flemish transport company De Lijn operates 17 night bus services from the city centre towards nearby towns on Friday and Saturday night from 22:30 until 03:00.
 Ghent: De Lijn also operates nine night bus services in the city between 23:30 and 01:30, seven days a week.

Bulgaria 
Sofia: A night bus service was launched in Sofia by Sofia Urban Mobility Center on an experimental basis from 7 April 2018 (with a review scheduled for December 2018). It is unclear if the service is still running as of May 2022. Four routes were included (N1, N2, N3 and N4) and operated from 00:20 until 04:20 at intervals of 40 minutes. Tickets for the night bus could be obtained solely from conductors on the bus, and not from the driver, machines or other public transport ticket sale points. Tickets for the night bus cost 2 leva compared to the daytime price of 1.60 leva. Knyaz Alexander Square was chosen as the site of a transfer location where all night bus lines met and passengers could switch lines. In July 2018 the introduction of the service was welcomed by citizens organization Spasi Sofia noting it as an exceptional success and a great improvement for transport in the city. They further suggested that the night service be advertised with bilingual visual information at Sofia Airport for the benefit of tourists, and proposed the introduction of a fifth night line (H5) to serve the airport, which was underserved at night.

Czech Republic
Prague: Prague tram network runs services on 10 night routes (90-99) at 30 minute intervals from Sunday to Thursday, and at 20 minute intervals on Fridays and Saturdays. There are also 16 night bus routes (901-916) which run 30–60 minutes except for 903 line which runs every 120 minutes.

Denmark
Copenhagen: Copenhagen Metro : the 4 lines of the Copenhagen Metro run 24/7. Øresundståg is a 24/7 train between Østerport via Copenhagen in Denmark to Malmö and Lund in southern Sweden. Movia is the public transport agency that is responsible for buses and certain local railways in Copenhagen. Movia has 7 night bus lines: 90N, 91N, 93N, 94N, 97N, 98N and 99N which mostly operate on Friday and Saturday nights between 01:00 and 05:00. Buses generally depart on the hour or every second hour. The night-bus bus-stop signs are recognisable by their grey colour.

Finland
Helsinki: Bus public transportation in Helsinki is managed by Helsinki Region Transport (Finnish: Helsingin seudun liikenne, or HSL). Helsinki metro services operate between the hours of 05:30 and 23:30 Monday-Saturday, and slightly less on Sundays (starting at 06.30). Most bus lines start at 05:30 in the morning and finish at 23:45, with the most popular lines running a bit later until 01.30am. At the weekend, nightlines are operated between 01:30 and 04:00 and offer direct bus connections between Helsinki city centre and outlying areas. To get to the same areas during the daytime would require a combination of train, bus or metro but at night they are direct buses. There at least 40 such night routes in the Helsinki bus network (fi). Bus drivers do not sell tickets or cards onboard; they must be purchased in advance, and Helsinki Central Station is the local transport hub for buses in the city centre.

France
Paris: Noctilien buses Paris has 48 routes in service 7 days from 00:30 to 05:30.
Lyon: The Lyon public transport agency TCL operates three bus routes (PL1, PL2, PL3), labelled  ('full moon') (fr), which depart the city once per hour through the night from 01:15 - 04:15 (Thursday–Saturday). The transport card used on the Lyon bus network (day and night) is called the "TCL". All TCL tickets and season tickets are valid on the Full Moon lines.

Germany
Berlin: The 9 Metrotram lines operate 24 hours a day, seven days a week. From 12:30 a.m. to 5 a.m., trams arrive in 30-minute intervals. The 18 MetroBus lines run 24 hours a day, seven days a week, in 30-minute intervals by late night. Night bus lines are marked with the letter N and operate all night. 8 night bus lines (N1 to N9) replace the subway lines U1 to U9 (not the U4) at night from Monday till Friday. Other 42 night bus lines (N10 to N97) replace the most important daytime bus lines seven days a week every 30 minutes. On nights from Friday to Saturday, from Saturday to Sunday, and before public holidays the U-Bahn operates 24 hours and at night the trains run in 15-minute-intervals while the S-Bahn operates 24 hours and at night the trains run in 30-minute-intervals. From next 9 December 2022, the train RE8 will have a 24/7 service between Flughafen BER-Terminal 1-2 station and Berlin Zoologischer Garten station stopping also at the following stations: Berlin Ostkreuz, Berlin Ostbahnhof, Berlin Alexanderplatz, Berlin Friedrichstraße and Berlin Hbf.
Cologne: the S19 line of the Rhine-Ruhr S-Bahn system  between Duren and Hennef for 17 stations including Cologne Hbf and Cologne/Bonn Airport and the RB26 line of the Trans Regio operator between Köln/Bonn Flughafen and Bonn Hbf for 10 stations, including Cologne Hbf, are 24/7 service.
Dresden: DVB is the municipal company in charge of transport in the city of Dresden. DVB provides a night service named  ('goodnight line'), which operates every day of the week Monday-Sunday, although the frequency of the buses is greater on Friday, Saturday and before holidays when the routes run every 30 minutes between 22:45 and 04:45. DVB also provides an extension taxi service called  (or 'alita' for short) where taxis run on certain routes as a replacement for regular trams and buses at times of very low demand. Alita trips are considered normal public transport trips and do not cost more than a bus ticket. The customer can order an alita taxi themselves, or, between 10 p.m. and 4 a.m., can request one from the tram or bus driver who is driving them, who will contact an alita taxi to wait at the passengers intended exit stop to facilitate their onward journey. Postplatz is the most important hub for night-time travel in Dresden. Most GuteNachtLinie routes meet here at the same time to allow people to switch routes. Further night travel in the Upper Elbe region is provided by VVO.
Frankfurt: the S8/S9 line of the Rhine-Main S-Bahn system has a 24/7 service through the Citytunnel with a 30 minutes frequency between 1:00am and 4:30am from Frankfurt Flughafen Regionalbahnhof to Konstablerwache (1:11am/4:11am from Konstablerwache to Frankfurt Flughafen Regionalbahnhof) and a 60 minutes frequency between 00.49AM and 3:49am from Wiesbaden Hbf and Hanau Hbf (1:46am/3:46am from Hanau Hbf to Wiesbaden Hbf).
Hanover: the S5 of the Hanover S-Bahn (in German: S-Bahn Hannover) system has a 24/7 service from Hannover Hauptbahnhof (central station) to Hannover Flughafen.
Munich:The S8 of the Munich S-Bahn is 24/7 (only to airport direction).
Mid-week: On nights before working days the four night tram lines N16, N19, N20 and N27 as well as the night buses N40-N41-N43-N44-N45-N72-N74 and N272 are in service. Every hour between 1:30a.m. and 4:30a.m. all night tram lines and the night buses N40 and N41 meet for five minutes at the interchange station Karlsplatz (Stachus) where passengers can change to any other night line.
On weekends: On the nights before Saturdays, Sundays and public holidays these same services run every half hour. That means they then meet every 30 minutes at the interchange station Karlsplatz (Stachus). Additionally, every half hour the night buses N71–N75-N77-N78 and N79 operate – every hour the night buses N80 and N81. Shortly after 2a.m. late night suburban trains still run to almost all stations in the area.

Greece
Athens: OSY (Odikes SYgkinonies), or Road Transport, is the main operator of the bus network in Athens. As of 2017, its network consisted of about 322 bus lines spanning the Athens Metropolitan Area. Daytime buses in the city run between 05:00 – 00:00 generally. OSY has five bus routes which operate on a 24-hour basis; the 11, 40, 500, 790 and X14. Most routes depart on a 30-60 minute frequency Mon-Sun. It also runs three intermunicipal night lines (which operate after midnight). The Athens Transport Authority also operates four 24-hour express bus lines from Athens International Airport to different parts of the city. The X95 links to the city centre, the X93 links to Kifissos and Liosion bus stations, the X96 links to the Port of Piraeus and the X97 links to Elliniko metro station. As of 2021 the fare on these services was 5.50 euro per person.

Hungary
Budapest: 1 tram line (6) and 42 bus lines (many routes have very few and irregular departures) run every night.

Iceland
Reykjavík: Strætó bs operates city buses in the Icelandic capital Reykjavík and surrounding satellite towns and suburbs. The first regular night bus service in Reykjavík started in January 2018 on a year-long trial basis. The service consisted of six routes (101, 102, 103, 105, 106, and 111) which started at the central bus station Hlemmur running out to the suburbs. These six night-bus routes operated only at weekends and between the hours of 00:00 and 04:30 departing on an hourly basis. The buses took passengers to all the major neighbourhoods in Reykjavík, but would not take any passengers on their return journey to the centre. Route 111 was discontinued in January 2019 due to low ridership, while the remaining five were kept on until 31 March 2020 when all night buses in Reykjavík were suspended until further notice as a result of the COVID-19 pandemic. In July 2022, Strætó resumed the night service. The previous routes of the 101, 102, 103, 105 and 106 were re-instated as well as two new routes named the 104 and 107 (Route 107 follows much the same route as route 111 which was discontinued in January 2019). As before, the night buses leave from Reykjavík city centre on Friday and Saturday nights only, and is only an outbound service. Prices were reduced, meaning that customers who use dedicated Strætó cards or apps (such as Klapp card, Klapp app, Klapp ten, Bus card or Strætó app) pay the same fare as buses during the day (490 kr). However customers who want to pay with debit/credit cards or cash need to pay a premium fare of 1,000 kr. per journey.

Ireland
Cork: The first 24-hour bus in the Republic of Ireland, route 220, was initiated in Cork city in January 2019.  The 220 links the two major satellite towns of Ballincollig and Carrigaline with the city centre and after its half-hourly 23:55, 00:25 and 01:00 departures, operates once an hour between the hours of 01:30 - 05:30. 
Dublin: Since December 1991, Dublin Bus has operated a 'Nitelink' service on Friday and Saturday nights that (as of Jan 2023) consists of 12 separate routes that depart between the hours of 00:00 and 04:00 from Dublin city centre and journey to the suburbs. The service only operates on Fri/Sat night however (technically the early hours of Saturday and Sunday), and at an increased fare. 
 Dublin: Since December 2019, Dublin Bus started operating some routes on the regular bus network on a 24-hour basis. As of January 2023, there are 10 such routes. These include route numbers 15, 39a, 41, C1, C2, C5, C6, G1, G2 and N4. The fare on these 24-hour routes remains the same at night as it is during the day.
Limerick: The first 24-hour bus in Limerick city is expected to begin service in 2025.

Italy
Rome: 30 night routes of the ATAC buses run every night between 12AM-5AM.
Milano: 5 night bus routes (NM1-NM2-NM3-N25/N26 and trolleybus 90/91)  of the ATM in service 7 days and other 9 lines (N15-N24-N27-N42-N50-N54-N57-N80-N94) work only on weekends.
Palermo: 7 night bus routes (N1 to N7) of the AMAT in service 7 days.

Lithuania
Vilnius: Vilniaus viešasis transportas (VVT) are the company in charge of operating the bus network and trolleybus network in the city of Vilnius. The buses transport about 298,000 passengers every day on their normal weekday service which operates between 05:30-23:30. The night bus route network was designed in 2015 to allow a safe journey from the city centre to the most densely populated neighbourhoods. There are normally six night bus routes in the city that operate from 00:00 to 05:00 (A88N, A101N, A102N, A103N, A104N and A105N), but due to the COVID-19 pandemic only the A88N (Airport–Center–Europa Shopping Center) has been running to ensure people can get from the airport to the city, and vice versa. The A88N bus runs every 40 minutes (approx.) throughout the night from 23:30 to 05:30. All tickets are valid onboard. The rest of the Vilnius night bus routes will be returned to normal operation when public transport recovers to pre-COVID passenger flow.

Norway
Oslo: The night bus in Oslo is provided by the city's public transport authority Ruter. The night buses run Friday night, Saturday night and on nights before public holidays. Additionally, the lines 31 and 37 run 24 hours a day year-round. There is no increased night fare, meaning the passenger can use the same tickets both day and night. 
Tromsø: Troms fylkestrafikk operate the buses in Tromsø which is the main public transport service there. Buses run from early morning to late night Monday–Friday, with less frequent service on weekends. There is also a night bus service on Friday and Saturday nights from the city centre to selected parts of the city suburbs.

The Netherlands

National Rail

 National rail operator NS runs an hourly overnight Intercity service between the major cities in the Randstad region between 1.00 am and 5.00 am. This service runs from Rotterdam via Delft, The Hague, Leiden, Schiphol Airport, Amsterdam Centraal and Utrecht. During Thursday nights the trains are rerouted via Gouda due to track maintenance works between Rotterdam and The Hague. 
 On Friday and Saturday nights NS runs one or two additional trains after the last daytime service has departed between cities in the Randstad region and regional cities throughout the Netherlands.

Regional public transport

 Almere: Keolis operates line M1, M2, M3, M4, M5, M6 and M7 from 4.30 am until 2.00 am and thus operate 22 hours a day. All services start at Almere Centrum station and radiate outwards towards the suburbs. On Saturdays lines M3, M4, M5, M6 and M7 operate from 4:30 am until 3.00 am and lines M1 and M2 operate 24 hours a day.
 Amsterdam: 
 City transport operator GVB operates lines N85 and N87 seven nights a week, and operates lines N81, N82, N83, N84, N88, N89, N91, N93 on Thursday, Friday and Saturday night and express line N86 on Friday and Saturday night. These lines start at the Central Station and radiate out towards the suburbs.
 GVB operates also the Ferry F3 (Buiksloterweg - Centraal Station) 24/7 with a 12-minute frequency between 12:00am and 6:24am.
 Regional bus operator EBS operates lines N01, N04 and N14 at an hourly frequency on Friday and Saturday night from the Central Station towards the cities of Purmerend and Hoorn and the towns in between.
 Regional bus operator Connexxion operates both line N30 and N97 seven nights a week at a 30-minute frequency. line N30 operates seven nights a week from Bijlmer ArenA station to Haarlem via Amstelveen and Schiphol Airport and line N97 operates from the Central Station via Schipol Airport towards Nieuw-Vennep. On Thursday, Friday and Saturday nights Connexxion operates lines N47 and N57 from the Central Station towards Uithoorn and Aalsmeer at an hourly frequency. On Friday and Saturday night Connexxion operates line N80, N92 and N94 at an hourly frequency departing from Leidseplein. Line N80 runs towards Haarlem and line N92 and N94 run towards the city of Zaandam via the northern suburbs of Amsterdam.
 Regional bus operator Keolis operates line N22 from Leidseplein and line N23 from Central Station hourly towards the city of Almere.
 Rotterdam (Suspended due to Covid-19): 
 Metro: On Friday and Saturday nights RET operates all metro lines until 1:30 a.m. instead of 12:30 a.m. The majority of the metro lines do not operate their entire daytime length, as some stretches of line are served by other lines. Some stations are not served as some municipalities along the metro lines are not willing to pay for the night service.
 Night bus:
 City transport operator RET operates the BOB-Bus network on Friday and Saturday nights. The BOB-Bus network consists of 15 lines which start at the Central Station and radiate outwards to the suburbs and cities and towns in the region. Line B1, B2, B3, B4, B5, B7, B8, B9, B10, B11, B13, B16 and B19 operate both nights and line B17 and B18 operate only on Saturday nights. On Friday nights the majority of lines run every hour, with some lines running a few buses a night and some lines running every 30 minutes. On Saturday nights the majority of lines run every 30 minutes, with some lines running a few buses a night and some lines running every 20 minutes.
 Regional bus operator Connexxion operates line 860 and 867 on Saturday nights towards the municipality of Hoekse Waard. Both lines run twice a night and depart from the Central Station.

Poland 
Warsaw: The Public Transport Authority (ZTM Warszawa), branded as Warsaw Public Transport (WTP), is a local authority controlled body which manages all means of public transport in Warsaw. Bus transport in Warsaw includes approximately 43 night lines which run between the hours of 23:00 and 05:00. and are numbered N01 to N95. The basic bus connections make up a network of lines joining remote districts with the centre, serviced every 30 or 60 minutes. The routes converge by the Warszawa Centralna railway station (Central Railway Station) which enables passengers to change lines if needed. All night buses (except the N01, N02, N03, N50, N56 and N58) depart 15 and 45 minutes after each full hour (from 23:15 to 4:45) from the loop at the Central Railway Station, or the Roman Dmowski Roundabout (pl) aka  bus stop. Fares on night buses are the same as for day lines.
Krakow: ZTP also manages all means of public transit, in this case, in Krakow. It was introduced in 1957, with tram services. However, these were replaced by buses in 1971 and last line was closed in 1986. Night trams were returned in 2013, with the three lines: 62, 64 and 69. The main interchange point, which ZTP refers it as "a meeting place for all night  tram and bus lines" is at Teatr Słowackiego (near Kraków Main station).

Portugal 
Lisbon: 6 night bus routes (201-202-206-207-208 and 210) run seven days.

Slovakia 
Bratislava: Dopravný podnik Bratislava (DPB), the only provider of city public transport in Bratislava, operates 20 night routes between the hours of 23:30 and 03:30 (Mon-Sun). Fares are the same at night as during the day. The central transfer hub is Central Station and the sub-link transfer hub is Hodžovo Square. The basic interval of night services is 60 minutes, which is reduced to 30 minutes at certain times. DPB offer additional late night services during certain holidays, such as New Year's Eve.
Košice: The public transit system in Košice is managed by the Košice Transit Company (Slovak: Dopravný podnik mesta Košice (DPMK)). The city is served by seven night bus lines numbered N1 to N7 from 23:10 to 04:30. Night services run at an hourly interval, and during the nights before a working day, the interval after 01:00 is extended to 90 minutes. The buses depart from Staničné námestie ("Station Square") in the centre of Košice. 
Žilina: Public transport in Žilina city is operated by Dopravný podnik mesta Žiliny (DPMŽ). Nightlines in Žilina started in 1970 with one route, the 50, which continues to operate as the sole night bus in the city, operating from 22:55 to 04:22 every 90 minutes. Route 50 makes a circuitous route of all major residential areas, and terminates at Železničná stanica, the principal railway station. As of Oct 2022, it departs from its termini four times during the night, and runs at the same time regardless of it being a work day (PRACOVNÉ DNI), school holiday (PRÁZDNINY) or weekend (VOĽNÉ DNI).

Spain 
Barcelona: All bus routes serving Barcelona metropolitan area are organized by Autoritat del Transport Metropolità (ATM). Local services are operated in most part by Transports Metropolitans de Barcelona (TMB), although other bus services are operated by several private companies under common names. Nitbus (es) is the name of Barcelona's night metropolitan bus network. As of June 2022 there are 20 lines in the network (numbered N0-N9, N11-N19 and N28), operated by two different companies: Tusgsal (es) and Mohn. The buses that are part of the Nitbus fleet operate between 22:20 and 06:00 (depending on the line; each is governed by different schedules), with a frequency of 3 buses per hour (that is, a frequency of 20 minutes). All Nitbus lines (except N0 and N19 routes) stop at the central square of Plaça de Catalunya, so it is possible to change lines.
Madrid: 
Urban transport, i.e. journeys that take place within the municipal territory of Madrid, are operated by the Empresa Municipal de Transportes de Madrid (also known as EMT Madrid). There is a dense network of bus routes which operates 24 hours a day. Special services called the "N lines" are operated during nighttime. The buses in Madrid are the only public transport system available around the clock as the metro network closes down between 02:00 and 06:00 am. Night buses began in Madrid in October 1974 with 11 lines. From 2006 to 2013 while the Madrid Metro was being upgraded, a night bus named Búho Metro (es), or Metro Owl, also existed in Madrid whose network simulated the lines of the Metro, but above ground. This service only operated on Friday, Saturday, and holiday eves and line numbers were denoted by an 'L' prefix. These routes are numbered N1 to N28. Their frequency depends on the time of night and the part of the city they travel to, but generally they run every 35 minutes on weekdays and every 15–20 minutes on weekends. Most night lines in the network depart from Plaza de Cibeles in the centre of Madrid, except the N25 and N26 which depart from Alonso Martínez. The buses departure times coincide with those of other lines to allow transfers. Night lines have the same fares as daytime lines, and the same tickets can be used.  
Intercity transport, i.e. journeys that go between different municipalities in the Madrid region, are operated by CRTM. The inter-urban buses, commonly known as Green Owls, travel further afield than the regular owl buses and connect Madrid with the cities of the periphery. As of June 2022 there are 40 such routes (but only the N101-N102 and N202 have at least one departure every hour, seven days). Green Owl buses are identified by the letter N followed by three numbers (e.g. N101). It has been noted that real-time indicators at bus stops usually display only the number of a route, and not the "N" at the beginning, which can be a cause of confusion for visitors, as the route 101 can have a completely different destination to the route N101 (for example).

Sweden 
Stockholm: SL operate all of Stockholm's land based public transport systems north and south of the city, including night buses. There are about 500 bus routes in total in Stockholm, of which 50 are night buses. Bus route numbers that are in the 90s or have 90s at the end of their number are distinguishable as night buses, such as routes 94, 191, 291, 592 and 890. Most night buses operate Mon-Sun (with an increased frequency on Sat, Sun nights and nights before Public Holidays) between approximately 01:00 and 05:00/06:00. Some routes operate as frequently as every 20–30 minutes, such as route 96 (01:18 - 05:53) whereas others such as route 396 operate every hour (02:17-04:18). Tickets cost the same day and night.
Malmö : Øresundståg is a 24/7 train between Østerport via Copenhagen in Denmark to Malmö and Lund in southern Sweden.

Switzerland 
Zürich: Zürcher Verkehrsverbund (or ZVV), is a public transportation system that combines rail, bus, tram, trolleybus, lake boat, cable car and other services in the Swiss canton of Zürich integrating them all into a single fare network with coordinated timetables. Zürich's nighttime network includes 17 night routes split between S-Bahn night trains as well as night buses. Since 2007, some S-Bahn night train lines provide a continuous 24-hour service from Friday morning until Sunday evening. A regular daytime ticket is sufficient for the use of the ZVV night network. All night buses and night S-Bahn trains are marked specially with the letter «N». The night services operate on Friday and Saturday nights, general holidays and some special occasions.
Rest of Switzerland: At weekends, passengers can travel by train at night in many regions and urban areas throughout Switzerland. These services are known by different names in different areas of the country, but include Nachtexpress, Moonliner, Noctambus, Mobinight, Pyjama Bus and Afterbus.

Turkey
Istanbul: Istanbul had operational bus routes, share taxis and the bus rapid transit system Metrobüs during the night hours, but the metro lines and other forms of rail transportation stopped their operations at midnight. On August 2019 a regular night service for the metro lines during the weekends and public holidays was implemented for the first time by the then newly elected Mayor of Istanbul Ekrem İmamoğlu. The night service on weekends was extended to the ferry lines on February 2020. Apart from the Metrobüs, which has the same night fare as daytime, all night lines cost two ticket price.
İzmir

United Kingdom and Crown dependencies
Cardiff: Cardiff Bus, the primary operator of bus services in Cardiff, Wales does not operate a night-time bus service. As of May 2022 the latest service leaves the city centre at 23:20.
Douglas, Isle of Man: Late night bus services on the Isle of Man are known as Hullad Oie, Manx for "night owl". Bus Vannin operate the routes. There are three routes (N1, N3, N5) which depart Lord Street, Douglas on Fri/Sat nights at 00:15 and 01:15 and serve the towns of Port St Mary, Ramsey and Peel. The single fare on a Hullad Oie Night Owl service is double the normal adult fare for the journey undertaken (e.g. the normal Douglas to Peel fare per person is £2.70, whereas the fare on Hullad Oie is £5.40). These fare conditions apply to any journeys departing after midnight. Over the Christmas 2020 period the Hullad Oie Night Owl services operated Friday and Saturday evenings despite COVID from 4 to 19 December departing from Douglas at the usual times. In March 2021 the services were paused for a period during a COVID-19 lockdown.
Glasgow: Night buses in Glasgow are operated by transport company First Glasgow and consist of nine separate routes that operate Fri and Sat night. The buses leave the city centre approximately once every hour between the hours of 00:00 and 04:00. The Night bus route numbers are prefixed by the letter 'N' and consist of the N2, N6, N9, N18, N38, N57, N60, N240 and N267.
London: The Night Tube is a service pattern on the London Underground and London Overground systems which provides night-time services to travellers on Friday and Saturday nights on the Central, Jubilee, Northern, Piccadilly, and Victoria lines, and a short section of the London Overground's East London line.
 London Buses has 56 routes in service 24/7 and other 61 routes with a night service. It is one of the oldest night services in the world with the first night bus introduced in 1913. 
Manchester: Greater Manchester has an extensive bus network managed by Transport for Greater Manchester (TFGM), including a night bus service (almost entirely a weekend night bus service) which is reputed to be one of the most extensive outside London. The network includes routes 43, 86, 103, 112, 142, 143, 192, 201, 203, 216 and 219. Most depart from the central point of Manchester Piccadilly.

Oceania

Australia
Adelaide: 'After Midnight' is the name of Adelaide's night bus service, operated by Adelaide Metro. These operate only on Saturday nights between 00:00 and 06:00 Sunday morning, departing the city every hour. The service comprises 15 separate routes, all beginning with the letter 'N'. As well as stopping at bus stops, drivers are able to drop passengers off at well-lit locations on the route if needed, such as service stations or fast food outlets.
Melbourne: Night Network is Melbourne's weekend overnight public transport system. It comprises all of Melbourne's regular electric railway lines, six tram lines, 21 night bus services, and four regional coach services. The night bus services replaced the previous NightRider services, with 10 operating radial from the CBD and the remaining 11 operating from suburban railway stations.
Sydney: NightRide, also Nightride, is a network of bus routes in operation between midnight and 4:30am in Sydney, Australia. The sixteen routes are run by bus operators as listed below and allow for a nightly shutdown of the Sydney Trains commuter rail network. The operators of such services are Busways, Hillsbus, Punchbowl Bus Company, Transdev John Holland and Transdev. Transport for NSW also advertises various other routes as late night or Night Owl services, the latter in Newcastle. The section between Central and The Star of the Inner West Light Rail, before the COVID, operated 24 hours a day, with an overnight frequency of 30 minutes.

New Zealand
Auckland: Auckland Transport, also known as AT, is the council-controlled organisation (CCO) of Auckland Council responsible for transport projects and services in the city. There are a total of 15 routes as part of the Night Bus and Northern Express bus services which operate on Friday and Saturday nights between the hours of 00:00 and 03:30. Most routes depart the city centre on an hourly basis.

North America

Canada
Edmonton: Since 2015, Edmonton Transit Service has offered a late-night OWL service on five bus routes until 03:00 AM, seven days per week. Transfers are designed to connect downtown on the hour and half hour.
Montreal : The Société de transport de Montréal (STM) operates 23 night lines on most major north–south and east–west arteries. These routes all have a number between 350 and 382. The highest frequency route is the 361 St-Denis which runs every few minutes on weekends. The other routes run at least once every 45 minutes, every night.
Ottawa: OC Transpo Night Service: six routes providing a regional skeletal service 24/7.
Toronto: The Blue Night Network is the overnight public transit service operated by the Toronto Transit Commission (TTC) in Toronto, Ontario, Canada. The network consists of a basic grid of 27 bus and four streetcar routes which run every 30 minutes, distributed so that almost all of the city is within 2 km of at least one route. It is the largest and most frequent night network in North America. 
Metro Vancouver: Translink NightBus: 10 routes with 6 1/2 providing 24/7 service (N8, N9, N10, N17, N20, N35, N19 Leaving Downtown) and 3 1/2 providing late-night service (N15, N22, N24, N19 Towards Downtown provide 20-22 hour a day service). Two routes, N8 and N20 operate shortened service (last bus leaving from downtown at 3:09 a.m.) on Monday early mornings only (Translink considers this Sunday service even though technically they mostly begin and all end on Monday early mornings). As well as the branded N-series of buses, Translink operates many bus routes that operate late into the night and start early in the morning.

United States
Austin: Capital Metro operates 5 night owl bus routes (481-483-484-485-486) Monday-Saturday from midnight until 3 a.m.
Baltimore: MTA Maryland operates 24-hour service on all 12 CityLink lines, LocalLink routes 54, 75 and 80.
Chicago: Red and Blue Lines of the Chicago "L" run 24/7, as well as the Night Owl bus network (17 CTA lines and 1 PACE line)
Cincinnati: SORTA's Metro service operates 24/7 service on bus routes 4, 11, 17, 33, 43, 51, and 78.
Cleveland: Greater Cleveland Regional Transit Authority operates 24/7 service on bus routes 1, 3, HealthLine, 10, 14, 19, 22, 25, 26, 28, 41, 48 and 51A.
Detroit: Detroit Department of Transportation operates 24/7 service on bus routes 3, 4, 5, 6, 7, 8, 10, 16, and 17.
Las Vegas Valley: RTC Transit runs 24-hour service on 13 of the 39 routes.
Los Angeles County, California: Owl bus service is available on Los Angeles County Metropolitan Transportation Authority Lines 2, 4, 16, 18, 20, 30, 33, 37, 40, 45, 51, 55, 60, 70, 76, 81, 92, 105, 111, 150, 162, 180, 204, 207, 217, 224, 233, 234, 240, 246, 251, G Line (Los Angeles Metro), J Line (Los Angeles Metro), and Foothill Transit's Silver Streak (bus)
Miami: Routes 3, 11, 27, 38, L, & S of the Miami Metrobus run 24/7. Routes 246 (Night Owl) & 500 (Midnight Owl) are overnight only routes.
Minneapolis–Saint Paul: METRO Green Line originally operated 24 hours a day, seven days a week, but as of 2019 trains are replaced by buses from 2 am to 4 am on weekdays. However, all owl service was suspended March 25, 2020 due to the COVID-19 pandemic. During late nights the METRO Blue Line operates as a shuttle between the 2 airport terminals.
New Orleans: The three main streetcars and many bus routes run 24 hours, seven days
New York metropolitan area: Most transit systems, including 21 New York City Subway lines, Staten Island Railway, 2 Port Authority Trans-Hudson (PATH) lines, Long Island Rail Road (LIRR), AirTrain JFK, Staten Island Ferry, 110 MTA Regional Bus Operations lines run 24/7.
Philadelphia and Delaware Valley: 4 trolley lines (10-13-15-36) and 19 bus lines (6, 14, 17, 20, 23, 33, 37, 42, 47, 52, 56, 60, 66, 73, 79, 108, 109, G, and R) are 24/7; PATCO Speedline runs 24/7.
San Francisco Bay Area: All Nighter Bus Network.
Seattle: King County Metro operates a Night Owl network of 19 bus routes (routes with Night Owl service include the 3, 5, 7, 11, 36, 44, 48, 49, 65, 67, 70, 120, 124, 160, 161, and the RapidRide A, C, D, and E Lines), but almost all of them with a night frequency of more 60 minutes.

Mexico
Mexico City: RTP-Nochebús has 7 lines (11A-47A-57A-57-C76-115-200) which run daily 12am-5am every 15 minutes.

South America

Brazil
Rio de Janeiro: Rio Onibus, Rio de Janeiro. The city of Rio has a very developed bus network, and many lines operate 24 hours a day. The public Bus is a good way to move around the city while it's not during the rush hour or late at night. Buses are identified by a number that refers to the bus route and a destination on its front sign. Also a "BRS" number that indicates which bus points the bus stops at. Due to the enormous number of buses running in Rio, the bus points are classified by a BRS number (from 1 to 6) and different buses stop at different bus points with the same BRS number.

Argentina
Buenos Aires: Colectivo Bus has 123 routes in service 24/7 with a night frequency of at least 30 minutes or max 60 minute just a few routes.

In popular culture
London night buses were the inspiration for the Knight Bus found in J. K. Rowling's Harry Potter book and film series (which is a pun on night bus).
The Chicago Surface Lines owl service was mentioned in a number of poems by Carl Sandburg:
"Old Woman" (1916): "The owl-car clatters along, dogged by the echo..." 
"Blue Island Intersection" (1922): "The owl car blutters along in a sleep-walk." 
"Nights Nothings Again" (1922): "A taxi whizzes by, an owl car clutters, passengers yawn reading street signs..."
In act II, scene 2 of the Tennessee Williams play A Streetcar Named Desire (1947), Mitch tells Blanche how he'll get home: "I'll walk over to Bourbon and catch an owl-car."
The 1997 Swedish film Nattbuss 807 depicts an incident in a night bus.
A 2007 Italian noir-comedy film directed by Davide Marengo was entitled Night Bus.
The Randy Travis song "Three Wooden Crosses" depicts a night bus travel.

References

External links
Map of the Blue Night Network in Toronto, the largest dedicated overnight transport network in North America